Issa Hakizimana (born 28 August 1994) is a Burundian professional footballer who plays as a defender for Football League club Flambeau du Centre FC and the Burundi national team.

International career
He was invited by Lofty Naseem, the national team coach, to represent Burundi in the 2014 African Nations Championship held in South Africa.

References

1994 births
Living people
Burundian footballers
Association football defenders
Futuro Kings FC players
Burundi international footballers
Burundi A' international footballers
2014 African Nations Championship players
Burundian expatriate footballers
Burundian expatriates in Equatorial Guinea
Expatriate footballers in Equatorial Guinea